Muḥammad ibn Mūsā al-Khwārizmī, or al-Khwarizmi, was a Persian polymath from Khwarazm, who produced vastly influential works in mathematics, astronomy, and geography. Around 820 CE, he was appointed as the astronomer and head of the library of the House of Wisdom in Baghdad.

Al-Khwarizmi's popularizing treatise on algebra (The Compendious Book on Calculation by Completion and Balancing, c. 813–833 CE) presented the first systematic solution of linear and quadratic equations. One of his principal achievements in algebra was his demonstration of how to solve quadratic equations by completing the square, for which he provided geometric justifications. Because he was the first to treat algebra as an independent discipline and introduced the methods of "reduction" and "balancing" (the transposition of subtracted terms to the other side of an equation, that is, the cancellation of like terms on opposite sides of the equation), he has been described as the father or founder of algebra. The term algebra itself comes from the title of his book (the word al-jabr meaning "completion" or "rejoining"). His name gave rise to the terms algorism and algorithm, the Spanish, Italian, and Portuguese terms algoritmo, and the Spanish guarismo and Portuguese algarismo, both meaning "digit".

In the 12th century, Latin translations of his textbook on arithmetic (Algorithmo de Numero Indorum) which codified the various Indian numerals, introduced the decimal positional number system to the Western world. The Compendious Book on Calculation by Completion and Balancing, translated into Latin by Robert of Chester in 1145, was used until the sixteenth century as the principal mathematical text-book of European universities.

In addition to his best-known works, he revised Ptolemy's Geography, listing the longitudes and latitudes of various cities and localities. He further produced a set of astronomical tables and wrote about calendaric works, as well as the astrolabe and the sundial. He also made important contributions to trigonometry, producing accurate sine and cosine tables, and the first table of tangents.

Life 

Few details of al-Khwārizmī's life are known with certainty. Ibn al-Nadim gives his birthplace as Khwarazm, and he is generally thought to have come from this region. His name means 'the native of Khwarazm', a region that was part of Greater Iran, and is now part of Turkmenistan, and Uzbekistan.

Muhammad ibn Jarir al-Tabari gives his name as Muḥammad ibn Musá al-Khwārizmī al-Majūsī al-Quṭrubbullī. The epithet al-Qutrubbulli could indicate he might instead have come from Qutrubbul (Qatrabbul), a viticulture district near Baghdad. However, Rashed denies this:

On the other hand, David A. King affirms his nisba to Qutrubul, noting that he was called al-Khwārizmī al-Qutrubbulli because he was born just outside of Baghdad.

Regarding al-Khwārizmī's religion, Toomer writes:

Ibn al-Nadīm's Kitāb al-Fihrist includes a short biography on al-Khwārizmī together with a list of his books. Al-Khwārizmī accomplished most of his work between 813 and 833. After the Muslim conquest of Persia, Baghdad had become the centre of scientific studies and trade. He worked in the House of Wisdom established by the Abbasid Caliph al-Ma'mūn, where he studied the sciences and mathematics, including the translation of Greek and Sanskrit scientific manuscripts. He was also a historian who is frequently cited by the likes of al-Tabari and Ibn Abi Tahir.

During the reign of al-Wathiq, he is said to have been involved in the first of two embassies to the Khazars.

Douglas Morton Dunlop suggests that Muḥammad ibn Mūsā al-Khwārizmī might have been the same person as Muḥammad ibn Mūsā ibn Shākir, the eldest of the three Banū Mūsā.

Contributions 

Al-Khwārizmī's contributions to mathematics, geography, astronomy, and cartography established the basis for innovation in algebra and trigonometry. His systematic approach to solving linear and quadratic equations led to algebra, a word derived from the title of his book on the subject, "The Compendious Book on Calculation by Completion and Balancing".

On the Calculation with Hindu Numerals, written about 820, was principally responsible for spreading the Hindu–Arabic numeral system throughout the Middle East and Europe. It was translated into Latin as Algoritmi de numero Indorum. Al-Khwārizmī, rendered as (Latin) Algoritmi, led to the term "algorithm".

Some of his work was based on Persian and Babylonian astronomy, Indian numbers, and Greek mathematics.

Al-Khwārizmī systematized and corrected Ptolemy's data for Africa and the Middle East. Another major book was Kitab surat al-ard ("The Image of the Earth"; translated as Geography), presenting the coordinates of places based on those in the Geography of Ptolemy but with improved values for the Mediterranean Sea, Asia, and Africa.

He also wrote on mechanical devices like the astrolabe and sundial.  He assisted a project to determine the circumference of the Earth and in making a world map for al-Ma'mun, the caliph, overseeing 70 geographers. When, in the 12th century, his works spread to Europe through Latin translations, it had a profound impact on the advance of mathematics in Europe.

Algebra 

The Compendious Book on Calculation by Completion and Balancing is a mathematical book written approximately 820 CE. The book was written with the encouragement of Caliph al-Ma'mun as a popular work on calculation and is replete with examples and applications to a wide range of problems in trade, surveying and legal inheritance. The term "algebra" is derived from the name of one of the basic operations with equations (meaning "restoration", referring to adding a number to both sides of the equation to consolidate or cancel terms) described in this book. The book was translated in Latin as Liber algebrae et almucabala by Robert of Chester (Segovia, 1145) hence "algebra", and also by Gerard of Cremona. A unique Arabic copy is kept at Oxford and was translated in 1831 by F. Rosen. A Latin translation is kept in Cambridge.

It provided an exhaustive account of solving polynomial equations up to the second degree, and discussed the fundamental method of "reduction" and "balancing", referring to the transposition of terms to the other side of an equation, that is, the cancellation of like terms on opposite sides of the equation.

Al-Khwārizmī's method of solving linear and quadratic equations worked by first reducing the equation to one of six standard forms (where b and c are positive integers)
 squares equal roots (ax2 = bx)
 squares equal number (ax2 = c)
 roots equal number (bx = c)
 squares and roots equal number (ax2 + bx = c)
 squares and number equal roots (ax2 + c = bx)
 roots and number equal squares (bx + c = ax2)

For example, x2 = 40x − 4x2 is reduced to 5x2 = 40x.  is the process of bringing quantities of the same type to the same side of the equation. For example, x2 + 14 = x + 5 is reduced to x2 + 9 = x.

The above discussion uses modern mathematical notation for the types of problems that the book discusses. However, in al-Khwārizmī's day, most of this notation had not yet been invented, so he had to use ordinary text to present problems and their solutions. For
example, for one problem he writes, (from an 1831 translation)

In modern notation this process, with x the "thing" ( shayʾ) or "root", is given by the steps,

Let the roots of the equation be x = p and x = q. Then ,  and

So a root is given by

S. Gandz has described Al-Khwarizmi as the father of Algebra :

Victor J. Katz adds :

J.J. O'Conner and E.F. Robertson wrote in the MacTutor History of Mathematics archive:

R. Rashed and Angela Armstrong write:

According to Swiss-American historian of mathematics, Florian Cajori, Al-Khwarizmi's algebra was different from the work of Indian mathematicians, for Indians had no rules like the ''restoration'' and ''reduction''. Regarding the dissimilarity and significance of Al-Khwarizmi's algebraic work from that of Indian Mathematician Brahmagupta, Carl Benjamin Boyer wrote: It is true that in two respects the work of al-Khowarizmi represented a retrogression from that of Diophantus. First, it is on a far more elementary level than that found in the Diophantine problems and, second, the algebra of al-Khowarizmi is thoroughly rhetorical, with none of the syncopation found in the Greek Arithmetica or in Brahmagupta's work. Even numbers were written out in words rather than symbols! It is quite unlikely that al-Khwarizmi knew of the work of Diophantus, but he must have been familiar with at least the astronomical and computational portions of Brahmagupta; yet neither al-Khwarizmi nor other Arabic scholars made use of syncopation or of negative numbers. Nevertheless, the Al-jabr comes closer to the elementary algebra of today than the works of either Diophantus or Brahmagupta, because the book is not concerned with difficult problems in indeterminant analysis but with a straight forward and elementary exposition of the solution of equations, especially that of second degree. The Arabs in general loved a good clear argument from premise to conclusion, as well as systematic organization – respects in which neither Diophantus nor the Hindus excelled.

Arithmetic 

Al-Khwārizmī's second most influential work was on the subject of arithmetic, which survived in Latin translations but is lost in the original Arabic. His writings include the text kitāb al-ḥisāb al-hindī ('Book of Indian computation'), and perhaps a more elementary text, kitab al-jam' wa'l-tafriq al-ḥisāb al-hindī ('Addition and subtraction in Indian arithmetic'). These texts described algorithms on decimal numbers (Hindu–Arabic numerals) that could be carried out on a dust board. Called takht in Arabic (Latin: tabula), a board covered with a thin layer of dust or sand was employed for calculations, on which figures could be written with a stylus and easily erased and replaced when necessary. Al-Khwarizmi's algorithms were used for almost three centuries, until replaced by Al-Uqlidisi's algorithms that could be carried out with pen and paper.

As part of 12th century wave of Arabic science flowing into Europe via translations, these texts proved to be revolutionary in Europe.  Al-Khwarizmi's Latinized name, Algorismus, turned into the name of method used for computations, and survives in the modern term "algorithm". It gradually replaced the previous abacus-based methods used in Europe.

Four Latin texts providing adaptions of Al-Khwarizmi's methods have survived, even though none of them is believed to be a literal translation:
 Dixit Algorizmi (published in 1857 under the title Algoritmi de Numero Indorum)
 Liber Alchoarismi de Practica Arismetice
 Liber Ysagogarum Alchorismi
 Liber Pulveris
Dixit Algorizmi ('Thus spake Al-Khwarizmi') is the starting phrase of a manuscript in the University of Cambridge library, which is generally referred to by its 1857 title Algoritmi de Numero Indorum. It is attributed to the Adelard of Bath, who had also translated the astronomical tables in 1126. It is perhaps the closest to Al-Khwarizmi's own writings.

Al-Khwarizmi's work on arithmetic was responsible for introducing the Arabic numerals, based on the Hindu–Arabic numeral system developed in Indian mathematics, to the Western world. The term "algorithm" is derived from the algorism, the technique of performing arithmetic with Hindu-Arabic numerals developed by al-Khwārizmī. Both "algorithm" and "algorism" are derived from the Latinized forms of al-Khwārizmī's name, Algoritmi and Algorismi, respectively.

Astronomy 

Al-Khwārizmī's  ("astronomical tables of Siddhanta") is a work consisting of approximately 37 chapters on calendrical and astronomical calculations and 116 tables with calendrical, astronomical and astrological data, as well as a table of sine values.  This is the first of many Arabic Zijes based on the Indian astronomical methods known as the sindhind.  The word Sindhind is a corruption of the Sanskrit Siddhānta, which is the usual designation of an astronomical textbook. In fact, the mean motions in the tables of al-Khwarizmi are derived from those in the "corrected Brahmasiddhanta" (Brahmasphutasiddhanta) of Brahmagupta.

The work contains tables for the movements of the sun, the moon and the five planets known at the time. This work marked the turning point in Islamic astronomy. Hitherto, Muslim astronomers had adopted a primarily research approach to the field, translating works of others and learning already discovered knowledge. 

The original Arabic version (written c. 820) is lost, but a version by the Spanish astronomer Maslamah Ibn Ahmad al-Majriti (c. 1000) has survived in a Latin translation, presumably by Adelard of Bath (26 January 1126). The four surviving manuscripts of the Latin translation are kept at the Bibliothèque publique (Chartres), the Bibliothèque Mazarine (Paris), the Biblioteca Nacional (Madrid) and the Bodleian Library (Oxford).

Trigonometry 
Al-Khwārizmī's Zīj al-Sindhind also contained tables for the trigonometric functions of sines and cosine. A related treatise on spherical trigonometry is also attributed to him.

Al-Khwārizmī produced accurate sine and cosine tables, and the first table of tangents.

Geography 

 
Al-Khwārizmī's third major work is his  ("Book of the Description of the Earth"), also known as his Geography, which was finished in 833. It is a major reworking of Ptolemy's second-century Geography, consisting of a list of 2402 coordinates of cities and other geographical features following a general introduction.

A Latin translation is kept at the Biblioteca Nacional de España in Madrid. The book opens with the list of latitudes and longitudes, in order of "weather zones", that is to say in blocks of latitudes and, in each weather zone, by order of longitude. As Paul Gallez points out, this excellent system allows the deduction of many latitudes and longitudes where the only extant document is in such a bad condition as to make it practically illegible. Neither the Arabic copy nor the Latin translation include the map of the world itself; however, Hubert Daunicht was able to reconstruct the missing map from the list of coordinates. Daunicht read the latitudes and longitudes of the coastal points in the manuscript, or deduces them from the context where they were not legible. He transferred the points onto graph paper and connected them with straight lines, obtaining an approximation of the coastline as it was on the original map. He then does the same for the rivers and towns.

Al-Khwārizmī corrected Ptolemy's gross overestimate for the length of the Mediterranean Sea from the Canary Islands to the eastern shores of the Mediterranean; Ptolemy overestimated it at 63 degrees of longitude, while al-Khwārizmī almost correctly estimated it at nearly 50 degrees of longitude. He "also depicted the Atlantic and Indian Oceans as open bodies of water, not land-locked seas as Ptolemy had done." Al-Khwārizmī's Prime Meridian at the Fortunate Isles was thus around 10° east of the line used by Marinus and Ptolemy. Most medieval Muslim gazetteers continued to use al-Khwārizmī's prime meridian.

Jewish calendar 
Al-Khwārizmī wrote several other works including a treatise on the Hebrew calendar, titled  ("Extraction of the Jewish Era"). It describes the Metonic cycle, a 19-year intercalation cycle; the rules for determining on what day of the week the first day of the month Tishrei shall fall; calculates the interval between the Anno Mundi or Jewish year and the Seleucid era; and gives rules for determining the mean longitude of the sun and the moon using the Hebrew calendar. Similar material is found in the works of Abū Rayḥān al-Bīrūnī and Maimonides.

Other works 
Ibn al-Nadim's , an index of Arabic books, mentions al-Khwārizmī's , a book of annals. No direct manuscript survives; however, a copy had reached Nusaybin by the 11th century, where its metropolitan bishop, Mar Elias bar Shinaya, found it. Elias's chronicle quotes it from "the death of the Prophet" through to 169 AH, at which point Elias's text itself hits a lacuna.

Several Arabic manuscripts in Berlin, Istanbul, Tashkent, Cairo and Paris contain further material that surely or with some probability comes from al-Khwārizmī. Other papers, such as one on the determination of the direction of Mecca, are on the spherical astronomy.

Two texts deserve special interest on the morning width and the determination of the azimuth from a height . 

He also wrote two books on using and constructing astrolabes.

Honors 

 Al-Khwarizmi (crater) — A crater on the far side of the moon →  NASA Portal: Apollo 11, Photography Index.
13498 Al Chwarizmi — Main-belt Asteroid, Discovered 1986 Aug 6 by E. W. Elst and V. G. Ivanova at Smolyan.
11156 Al-Khwarismi — Main-belt Asteroid, Discovered 1997 Dec 31 by P. G. Comba at Prescott.

Notes

References

Further reading

Specific references

Biographical 
 
 Brentjes, Sonja (2007). "Khwārizmī: Muḥammad ibn Mūsā al‐Khwārizmī" in Thomas Hockey et al.(eds.). The Biographical Encyclopedia of Astronomers, Springer Reference. New York: Springer, 2007, pp. 631–633. (PDF version)
 
 Hogendijk, Jan P., Muhammad ibn Musa (Al-)Khwarizmi (c. 780–850 CE) – bibliography of his works, manuscripts, editions and translations.
 
 

 Sezgin, F., ed.,  Islamic Mathematics and Astronomy,  Frankfurt: Institut für Geschichte der arabisch-islamischen Wissenschaften, 1997–99.

Algebra 
 
 
 
 
 Barnabas Hughes. Robert of Chester's Latin translation of al-Khwarizmi's al-Jabr: A new critical edition. In Latin. F. Steiner Verlag Wiesbaden (1989). .

Arithmetic 
 
  (This is a new edition of the complete medieval Latin translation of the Arithmetic of al-Khwarizmi, previous editions are all incomplete. This work is lost in Arabic).

Astronomy 
 
  (Hogendijk's homepage. Publication in English, no. 25).
  (Description and analysis of seven recently discovered minor works related to al-Khwarizmi).
 
 
 Suter, Heinrich. [Ed.]: Die astronomischen Tafeln des Muhammed ibn Mûsâ al-Khwârizmî in der Bearbeitung des Maslama ibn Ahmed al-Madjrîtî und der latein. Übersetzung des Athelhard von Bath auf Grund der Vorarbeiten von A. Bjørnbo und R. Besthorn in Kopenhagen. Hrsg. und komm. Kopenhagen 1914. 288 pp. Repr. 1997 (Islamic Mathematics and Astronomy. 7). .
  (Van Dalen's homepage. List of Publications, Articles – no. 5).

Spherical trigonometry 
 B.A. Rozenfeld. "Al-Khwarizmi's spherical trigonometry" (Russian), Istor.-Mat. Issled. 32–33 (1990), 325–339.

Jewish calendar

Geography

General references 

 
 
 
 
 
 
 
 
 
 
 
 

780s births
850 deaths
8th-century Arabic writers
8th-century astrologers
8th-century Iranian astronomers
8th-century people from the Abbasid Caliphate
9th-century Arabic writers
9th-century astrologers
9th-century geographers
9th-century inventors
9th-century Iranian astronomers
9th-century people from the Abbasid Caliphate
9th-century Iranian mathematicians
Astronomers from the Abbasid Caliphate
Astronomers of the medieval Islamic world
Geographers from the Abbasid Caliphate
Inventors of the medieval Islamic world
Mathematicians from the Abbasid Caliphate
Mathematicians who worked on Islamic inheritance
Medieval Iranian astrologers
Medieval Iranian geographers
People from Xorazm Region
Transoxanian Islamic scholars
Persian physicists
Scientists who worked on qibla determination
Writers about religion and science
9th-century cartographers